The Cox Cup was a greyhound racing competition held annually at Newbridge Greyhound Stadium in Cornelscourt, Newbridge, County Kildare, Ireland. It was inaugurated in 1972  and was a prestigious competition in the Irish racing greyhound racing calendar. The last running of the event was in 2018.

Past winners

Venues and distances
 1964–1996	(Newbridge 525y)
 1997-present 	(Newbridge 550y)
 2016-2017 (not held)

References

Greyhound racing competitions in Ireland
Sport in County Kildare
Recurring sporting events established in 1964